Jüri Teemant's second cabinet was in office in Estonia from 23 July 1926 to 4 March 1927, when it was succeeded by Jaan Teemant's third cabinet.

Members

This cabinet's members were the following:

References

Cabinets of Estonia